The 2005 Open Canada Cup was the 8th edition of the Canadian Professional Soccer League's open league cup tournament running from late May through early September. Windsor Border Stars defeated London City 3-0 in the final played at Cove Road Stadium, London, Ontario. The victory marked Windsor's second Open Canada Cup title, and became the third club in the tournaments history to successfully defend their title. The tournament featured several clubs from the Ontario League, and saw the return of several clubs from the Ottawa Carleton Soccer League. Particularly the 2004 Open Canada Cup runner's up Ottawa St. Anthony Italia, and 2004 Canadian National Challenge Cup finalists and Ontario Cup champions Ottawa Royals S.C.

The Ontario amateur clubs began the tournament in the preliminary rounds while the CPSL clubs received an automatic bye to the second round. For the fourth straight year London City were granted the hosting rights to the finals. All CPSL clubs competed in the competition with the exception of Toronto Croatia which opted out in order to compete in the annual Croatian-North American Soccer Tournament.

Qualification

First round

Second round

Quarter-final

Semi-final

Final

Top scorers

References 

Open Canada Cup
2005 domestic association football cups
2005 in Canadian soccer